Gmina Osiek may refer to any of the following administrative districts in Poland:
Gmina Osiek, Kuyavian-Pomeranian Voivodeship
Gmina Osiek, Lesser Poland Voivodeship
Gmina Osiek, Pomeranian Voivodeship
Gmina Osiek, Świętokrzyskie Voivodeship